Robert Farmer is an Australian Paralympic lawn bowler. At the 1976 Toronto Games, he won a gold medal in the Men's Singles A.

References 

Paralympic gold medalists for Australia
Living people
Lawn bowls players at the 1976 Summer Paralympics
Paralympic lawn bowls players of Australia
Australian male bowls players
Year of birth missing (living people)
Medalists at the 1976 Summer Paralympics
Paralympic medalists in lawn bowls
20th-century Australian people